Henry Joseph Butcher (July 12, 1886 – December 28, 1979) was a Major League Baseball outfielder who played for two seasons. He played for the Cleveland Naps from 1911 to 1912.

External links

1886 births
1979 deaths
Cleveland Naps players
Major League Baseball outfielders
Rockford Reds players
Evansville River Rats players
New Orleans Pelicans (baseball) players
Portland Beavers players
Denver Bears players
Indianapolis Indians players
Fort Worth Panthers players
St. Joseph Saints players
Baseball players from Chicago